The 1948–49 National Hurling League was the 18th edition of the National Hurling League, which ran from 10 October 1948 until 8 May 1949.

Seventeen teams participated in the league, comprising two divisions of an unequal number of teams. Two points were awarded for a win and one point was awarded for a drawn game. The knock-out phase featured the top three teams from division one and the top two teams from division two.

Tipperary won the league, beating Cork by 3-5 to 3-3 in the final.

National Hurling League

Division 1

Results

Division 2

Results

External links
 1948-49 National Hurling League results

References

National Hurling League seasons
League
League